This page lists films set fully, or almost entirely, in only one location.

List of films

References

One location
One-location